Naqadeh County is in West Azerbaijan province, Iran. The capital of the county is the city of Naqadeh. At the 2006 census, the county's population was 117,831 in 27,937 households. The following census in 2011 counted 121,602 people in 33,684 households. At the 2016 census, the county's population was 127,671 in 37,481 households.

Etymology
Naqadeh is the current name of the county (and its main town). The former name, known as Solduz (also spelled Sulduz, in Kurdish: Sundus), in reference to the Mongol Sulduz tribe, may have replaced an older name (now lost) during the reign of the Ilkhanid ruler Ghazan in 1303.

History
In 1303, during the reign of Ilkhanid ruler Ghazan, the area comprising Naqadeh County was distributed in fiefs. According to the orientalist Vladimir Minorsky (died 1966), citing the 16th-century Kurdish prince and writer Sharafkhan Bidlisi, during the rule of the Turkoman Aq Qoyunlu and Qara Qoyunlu (in about the 15th century), "i.e. Jong after the Čōbānīs had disappeared", the Kurds of the Mukri (Mokri) tribe occupied the county of Naqadeh, and its old inhabitants were most likely "reduced to servitude". Minorsky, citing a mutilated and undated part of Bidlisi's work, narrates that a certain Budak of the Kurdish Baban tribe captured the county from the Qizilbash. This event may refer to one of the abrupt outbursts of skirmishes which occurred on the Safavid frontier.

In 1828, following the Treaty of Turkmenchay, Iranian crown prince Abbas Mirza handed over the territory of the county as a fief to 800 Turkic Qarapapaq families and these new settlers, in return, had to have 400 horsemen ready for disposal for the government. In this period, the county had a population of 4–5,000 of both Kurds and Muqaddam Shia Azerbaijanis. The town would gradually fall into the hands of the Azerbaijanis. The state-supported Qarapapaq consolidated their power quickly by attacking the Mangur and Zerza tribes.

By the early 20th century, the county consisted of 123 villages and small towns, which altogether numbered 8,000 families. The canton of Mamad-Shah is located in the southeastern-most corner of the county, the name of which is mentioned in the Sharafnama of Sharafkhan Bidlisi. In the early 20th century, the inhabitants of this canton were members of the Turkic Shamsaddihlu tribe. Members of the tribe had arrived in Qajar Iran with their chief Masi Beg, and were given 3 villages inhabited by 100 families of Kurdish peasants (raʿiyyat) by Abbas Mirza.

In the early 20th century, Sunni Kurds belonging to the Mamash, Zarza and Mukri tribes numbered 2,000 families within the county, comprising a quarter of the counties' total population. Ten villages within the county were entirely inhabited by these tribes (including Galvan, Vazneh, etc.) whereas eleven other villages (Chianeh, Naqadeh, Mameyand, etc.) were shared with the Qarapapaq.

The county, like that of Oshnavieh, is recorded as a Nestorian bishopric, but by 1914, there were only 80 Christian families left in its main town of Naqadeh. The Jews of the Naqadeh County, of which 120 families were located in the town of Naqadeh, were "probably the oldest element in the present population" of the county; virtually all have now emigrated to Israel.

During the Ottoman occupation from 1908 to 1912, the Azerbaijani population suffered considerably as they were seen as Iranian agents. The Ottomans attempted to destroy the tribal structure and free the rayah of the town. During World War I, the village of Haydarabad at Lake Urmia was turned into a Russian naval base, and a light railway was built through the county of Naqadeh. The territory that comprises the county would change hands between the Ottomans and the Russians in this period, until the Iranians took control in 1919.

Administrative divisions

The population history of Naqadeh County's administrative divisions over three consecutive censuses is shown in the following table. The latest census shows two districts, four rural districts, and two cities.

Geography
Naqadeh County is located to the south-west of Lake Urmia on the lower course of the Gadir-Chay river. The county is bordered to the west by Oshnavieh County, to the north by Dol which belongs to Urmia County, and to the south and east by the Paswa and Shari-weran cantons of Mahabad County.

References

Sources

 

Counties of West Azerbaijan Province